The K class was a class of three sloops designed in the late 1930s to replace the aging s of the Royal Netherlands Navy. Originally seven ships were planned of which three ships were laid down and two more ordered (which were canceled after the German invasion). Still incomplete at the start of the German invasion of the Netherlands and not yet launched, the ships were found undamaged by the German forces. The Kriegsmarine ordered the completion of K1, K2 and K3, then commissioned them for service in Norwegian and German home waters. After the war only K3 entered Dutch service as the Van Speijk.

Construction
K1 and K3 were laid down at the P. Smit Jr, Rotterdam shipyard in 1939. K2 was laid down at Gusto N.V., Schiedam shipyard also in 1939. Still incomplete at the start of the German invasion of the Netherlands and not yet launched, the ships were found undamaged by the German forces and the Kriegsmarine ordered the completion of K1, K2 and K3. K1 was launched on 23 November 1940. Both K2 and K3 were launched in 1941 on 28 June and 22 March. The ships were commissioned in 1941 and 1942.

Service history
The ships saw service in Norwegian and German home waters. K1 sank near Aarhus on 5 May 1945. K2 was found in Horten in 1945 and towed back to the Delfzijl where she sank by accident in November of that year. The ship was raised the next year on 26 July and towed to Den Helder where she was sold for scrap in October 1947 after inspection. After the war only K3 entered Dutch service as the Van Speijk after she was repaired at the Rijkswerf at Amsterdam. The ship was sold for scrap 29 August 1960.

Ships

External links
Description of class

Sloops of the Royal Netherlands Navy
Ships built in the Netherlands
World War II naval ships of Germany